This is a list of the complete squads for the 2018–19 World Rugby Women's Sevens Series.

Captains for a tournament have their jersey number marked in bold.

Australia
Coach: John Manenti

Canada
Coach: John Tait

China
Coach:  Chad Shepherd

England
Coach: James Bailey

Fiji
Coach: Alifereti Dovivereta

France
Coach: David Courteix

Ireland
Coach:  Anthony Eddy

New Zealand
Coach:
 Allan Bunting (to Kitakyushu)
 Cory Sweeney (Langford onwards)

Russia
Coach: Andrey Kuzin

Spain
Coach: Pedro de Matías

United States
Coach: Chris Brown

Invitational teams
One place in each tournament of the series is allocated to a national team based on performance in the respective continental tournaments within Africa, Asia, Europe, Oceania, and the Americas.

Brazil
Coach:  Reuben Samuel

Japan
Coach: Hitoshi Inada

Kenya
Coach: Kevin Wambua

Mexico
Coach:  Simon Pierre

Papua New Guinea
Coach:  Paul Tietjens

Scotland
Coach: Scott Forrest

See also
 2018–19 World Rugby Sevens Series squads (for men)

References

!
World Rugby Women's Sevens Series squads